Mateus Evangelista Cardoso (born 15 February 1994) is a Brazilian Paralympic athlete with cerebral palsy. He competes in several T37-classification athletics events. He represented Brazil at the 2016 Summer Paralympics held in Rio de Janeiro, Brazil and he won the silver medal in the men's long jump T37 event. In 2021, he won one the bronze medal in the same event at the 2020 Summer Paralympics held in Tokyo, Japan.

At the 2016 Summer Paralympics, he also finished in 4th place in the men's 100 metres T37 event.

Career 

He represented Brazil at the 2015 Parapan American Games held in Toronto, Canada and he won the gold medal in the men's long jump T37 event and both the men's 100 metres T37 and men's 200 metres T37 events.

At the 2017 World Para Athletics Championships held in London, United Kingdom, he won the gold medal in the men's 100 metres T37 event, the silver medal in the men's 200 metres T37 event and also the silver medal in the men's long jump T37 event. Two years later, at the 2019 World Para Athletics Championships held in Dubai, United Arab Emirates, he won the silver medal in the men's long jump T37 event and he qualified to represent Brazil at the 2020 Summer Paralympics in Tokyo, Japan.

References

External links 
 

1994 births
Living people
Brazilian male sprinters
Brazilian male long jumpers
Paralympic athletes of Brazil
Paralympic silver medalists for Brazil
Paralympic bronze medalists for Brazil
Paralympic medalists in athletics (track and field)
Track and field athletes with cerebral palsy
Athletes (track and field) at the 2016 Summer Paralympics
Athletes (track and field) at the 2020 Summer Paralympics
Medalists at the 2016 Summer Paralympics
Medalists at the 2020 Summer Paralympics
Medalists at the 2015 Parapan American Games
Medalists at the 2019 Parapan American Games
People from Porto Velho
Sportspeople from Rondônia
20th-century Brazilian people
21st-century Brazilian people